Aloe perryi (syn. Aloe forbesii Balf.f.; Aloe socotrina) is a species of plant in the genus Aloe. It is endemic to the island of Socotra in Yemen, and is often known by its common name, Socotrine aloe.

Distribution and habitat

Its natural habitat is rocky areas. Widely distributed and in places abundant, it is one of three Aloe species that naturally occur on the island of Socotra, the other two being Aloe jawiyon and Aloe squarrosa. Bitter aloes – the juice of Aloe perryi – has important pharmaceutical and medicinal properties. At present, it is under no immediate threat but some populations are potentially vulnerable to pests, climate change and over-harvesting.

Description
A variable species, usually a blue-green colour but sometimes reddish, especially in exposed positions. The inflorescence is branched, and the flowers reddish orange with yellow tips.

References

Endemic flora of Socotra
perryi
Near threatened plants
Taxonomy articles created by Polbot
Taxa named by John Gilbert Baker